Ray Butler (born 30 December 1965) is an Irish former Fine Gael politician who served as a Senator from 2016 to 2020, after being nominated by the Taoiseach. He previously served as a Teachta Dála (TD) for the Meath West constituency from 2011 to 2016.

Living in Trim, Butler's family is originally from Kells. He served on Trim Town Council from 2004 to 2011, including a year as mayor of that council, and was elected to Meath County Council in May 2009.

He lost his seat at the 2016 general election. Butler was nominated to the 25th Seanad in May 2016.

In 2019, it was reported that Butler had taken three years to repay the €30,000 severance allowance he received after losing his Dáil seat, which became forfeit and repayable once he accepted a nomination to the Seanad.

References

1965 births
Living people
Fine Gael TDs
Local councillors in County Meath
Members of the 31st Dáil
Members of the 25th Seanad
Nominated members of Seanad Éireann
Fine Gael senators